Belmont Lake State Park is a  day-use state park located in North Babylon, New York on Long Island.

History
Belmont Lake State Park was established in 1926 on land that was formerly part of the "Nursery Stud Farm", a Thoroughbred horse farm owned by August Belmont, namesake of the Belmont Stakes.

The park was selected by Robert Moses as regional headquarters for all state parks on Long Island in 1935. The park served as the headquarters of the Long Island State Park Commission and Long Island State Parkway Police from their founding in 1946 until their disbandment in 1977 and 1980, respectively. It now serves as the headquarters of the Long Island region of the New York State Office of Parks, Recreation and Historic Preservation, as well as the New York State Park Police.

Park description
Belmont Lake State Park is a day-use park, featuring boating and picnicking facilities in addition to playing fields for popular sports. Two modern children's playgrounds are also available. Pedal boats, rowboats and kayaks can be rented at the boat dock during May through Columbus Day, times/days of the week vary, however swimming is never permitted. If you own a kayak, it can be launched ONLY when the boat dock is open and ONLY from the boat dock, free of charge. Boat fees are: Kayaks/$20.00 for 2 hours. Rowboats and Pedal Boats/$15.00 for 1 hour and a half. When the parking fee is in effect, that is $8.00 per vehicle.

The park is located near the Southern State Parkway at Exit 38. Bike and pedestrian entrances exist at several points around the perimeter which are free all year long. Although these entrance points are free, it is illegal to park along the roadway to access them.

Permits may be purchased at the Long Island State Park Headquarters, located on Belmont Avenue at Exit 37N.

The park also contains a bicycle path leading to Southards Pond and Argyle Lake in the Village of Babylon.

See also
 List of New York state parks

References

External links

 New York State Parks: Belmont Lake State Park

State parks of New York (state)
Babylon (town), New York
Robert Moses projects
Belmont family
Urban public parks
Parks in Suffolk County, New York
1926 establishments in New York (state)
Protected areas established in 1926